Néstor García may refer to:

Néstor García (basketball) (born 1965), Argentine basketball coach
Néstor García (runner) (born 1975), Uruguayan marathon runner
Nestor García (wrestler) (born 1966), Venezuelan Olympic wrestler